= Panasonic TR-005 =

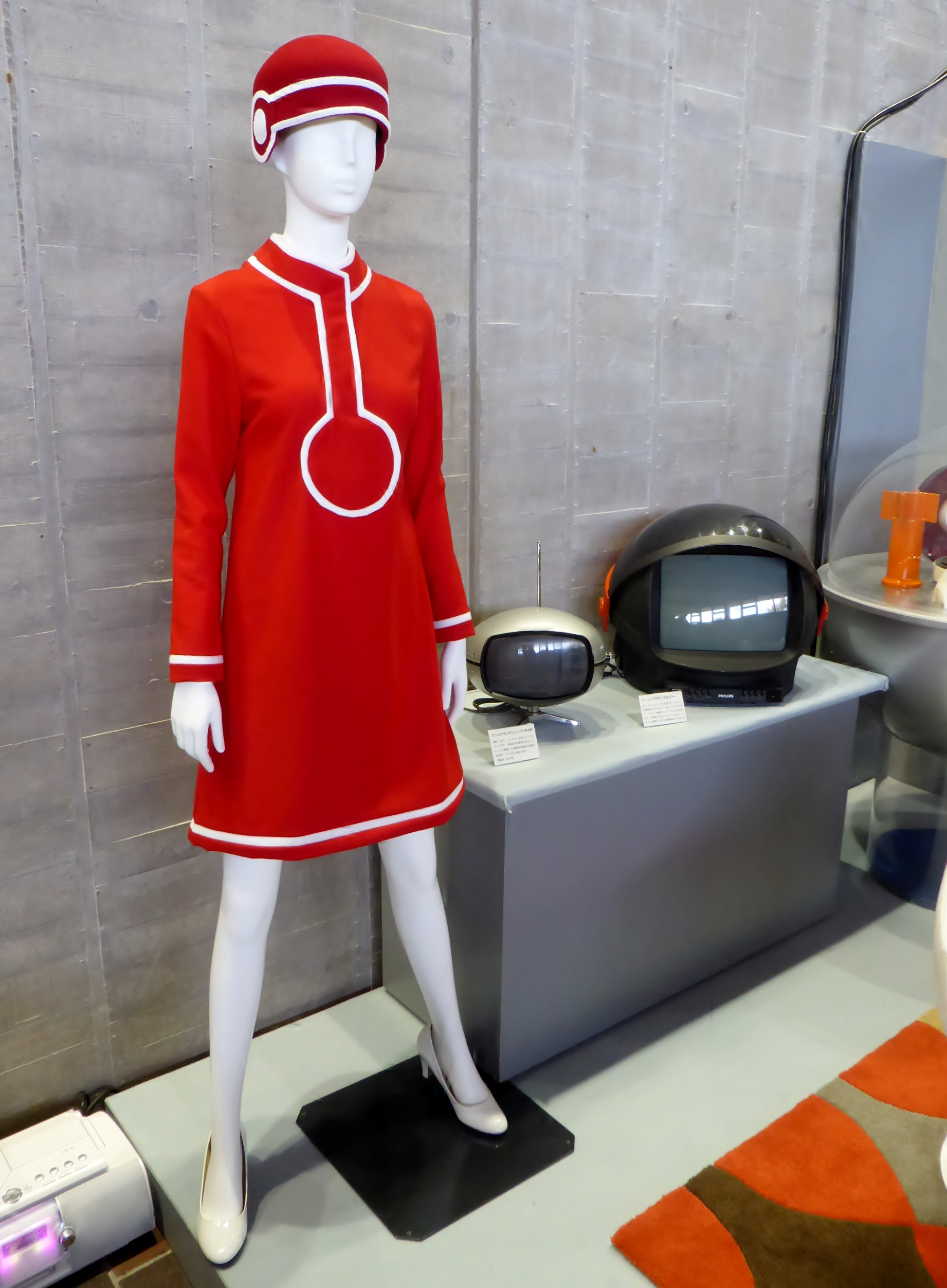
Panasonic TR-005 Orbitel (next to the mannequin) as part of the exhibition "The Demands of the Times! 1970 Design Exhibition – From Ivy League to the Space Age" at the Expo '70 in Osaka

Panasonic TR-005 Orbitel (also known as the "Flying Saucer" or "The Eyeball" due to its shape) was a television set that was manufactured from the late 1960s to early 1970s by Panasonic. It had a five-inch screen, earphone jack, and could rotate 180 degrees on its chrome tripod.
